The Yachats Ocean Road State Natural Site is a state park in southern Lincoln County, Oregon, in the town of Yachats.  It is administered by the Oregon Parks and Recreation Department.  It is located on the Pacific Ocean coast, adjacent to the Oregon Coast Highway and the mouth of the Yachats River.  The park is open for day use only, and offers scenic driving on a  loop, and wildlife and surf viewing, but is backed on its landward side by low-intensity urban development.

See also
 List of Oregon State Parks
 Yachats State Recreation Area

References

External links
 

State parks of Oregon
Oregon Coast
Parks in Lincoln County, Oregon